Pelayo is the Spanish form of the Latin name Pelagius. It may refer to:

 Pelagius of Asturias, founder of the Kingdom of Asturias and beginner of the Reconquista
 Pelagius of Córdoba, tenth-century Christian martyr
 Pelagius of Oviedo, bishop and chronicler
 Spanish battleship Pelayo, a battleship that served in the Spanish Navy from 1888 to 1925
 Ermita de San Pelayo y San Isidoro, a Romanesque hermitage that formerly was in Ávila, and whose ruins are now located in Madrid
 Pelayo, a synonym for the genus of South American spiders Josa

See also
Pelayo Rodríguez (disambiguation)
Pelagio (disambiguation)
Pelagius (disambiguation)